This is a list of notable Arab-Israeli Christians (also known as Palestinian-Israeli Christians).

The list is ordered by category of human endeavor. Persons with significant contributions in two fields are listed in both of the pertinent categories, to facilitate easy lookup.

Religious figures 

 Father Gabriel Naddaf - Greek Orthodox Church – priest and judge in religious courts. Spokesman for the Greek Orthodox Patriarchate of Jerusalem. 
 Munib Younan – elected president of the Lutheran World Federation since 2010 and the Evangelical Lutheran Church Bishop of Palestine and Jordan since 1998.
 Archbishop Theodosios (Hanna) of Sebastia — Bishop of the Orthodox Patriarchate of Jerusalem.
 Elias Chacour – Archbishop of Akko, Haifa, Nazareth and Galilee of the Melkite Eastern Catholic Church.
 Riah Hanna Abu El-Assal – former Anglican Bishop in Jerusalem.

Activists 
 Father Gabriel Naddaf - Greek Orthodox priest dedicated to integrating the Christian Arab community within Israel into Israeli society via service in military and national social service.
 Ameer Makhoul – a writer and public figure, the executive director of Palestinian network of non-governmental organizations Ittijah and the head of the High Follow-Up Committee for Arab Citizens of Israel.
 Sabri Jiryis – writer and  lawyer, a graduate of the Hebrew University law faculty, and prominent Palestinian activist.

Cultural figures

Film, TV, and stage 
 Makram Khoury – the youngest artist and the first Arab to win the Israel Prize, the highest civic honor in Israel. He is one of the most accomplished and well-known Israeli Arab actors.
 Amal Murkus – actress and singer.
 Nasri - singer.
 Elia Suleiman – film maker and actor.
 Hisham Zreiq – award-winning Independent film maker, poet and visual artist.
 Clara Khoury – actress.
 Yousef (Joe) Sweid – actor, dancer and puppeteer.

Popular musicians 
 Rim Banna – singer, composer, and arranger who is well known for her modern interpretations of traditional Palestinian Arab folk songs.

Writers 
 Emile Habibi – writer of Arabic expression, leader of the Israel Communist Party and Member of the Israeli Knesset.
 Anton Shammas – writer, poet, translator and editor.
 Daud Turki – poet, was the leader of the Israeli Jewish-Arab left-wing organization Revolutionary Communist alliance.
 Anton Shammas – essayist, writer of fiction and poetry and translator.
 Hisham Zreiq – award-winning Independent film maker, poet and visual artist.
 Sabri Jiryis – writer and lawyer, graduate of the Hebrew University law faculty, and prominent Palestinian activist.

Military 
 Elinor Joseph – soldier who has served with the Caracal Battalion of the Israel Defense Forces since 2010. She is the first Arab woman ever to serve in a combat role in the Israeli army.

Politicians and government officials 

 Tawfik Toubi - was an Israeli Arab communist politician. 
 Emile Habibi – writer of Arabic expression, leader of the Israel Communist Party and Member of the Israeli Knesset.
 Azmi Bishara – former member of the Knesset who left Israel after being suspected of spying for Hezbollah during the Second Lebanon War.
 Nadia Hilou – politician, who served as a member of the Knesset for the Labor Party between 2006 and 2009. She was the second female Israeli Arab MK after Hussniya Jabara, and also the first female Christian MK.
 Daud Turki – poet and the leader of the Israeli Jewish-Arab left-wing organization Revolutionary Communist alliance.
 Salim Joubran – Justice on the Supreme Court.
 George Karra - Justice on the Supreme Court.
 Hana Sweid – Member of the Knesset for Hadash.

Criminals 
 Elias Abuelazam –  suspect of racial. serial killing and multiple stabbings.

Miscellaneous 
 Elias Khoury – lawyer specializing in real property law who gained fame in the 1970s when he led a legal battle against the Israeli settlers of Sebastia and Elon Moreh.

Medicine 

 Amal Bishara - an Israeli Arab doctor, and the director of Bone Marrow Registry Outreach, Hadassah Medical Center, which is associated with the Hebrew University of Jerusalem in Israel. 
 Hossam Haick - a senior lecturer in chemical engineering and nanotechnology at the Technion-Israel Institute of Technology already has several patents in his pocket. Last year he was included as one of the world's 35 "most-promising young scientists" in the Massachusetts Institute of Technology's. 
 Yaqub Hanna - an Israeli Arab who is a postdoctoral fellow at MIT, earned his Ph.D. and M.D. from Hebrew University of Jerusalem. He specializes in the study of embryonic stem cells.

High tech 
 Johny Srouji a Senior Vice President of Hardware Technologies at Apple Inc.

Sports 

 Azmi Nassar – football manager and served as manager of the Palestinian national football team.
 Joel Abu Hanna - German-born Israeli professional footballer who plays as a centre-back for Legia Warsaw and the Israel national team.
 Karam Mashour - professional basketball player for Hapoel Galil Elyon of the Israeli Premier League.
 Marc Hinawi – swimmer.
 Maroun Gantous - association football player.
 Salim Tuama – soccer player playing for Hapoel Tel Aviv who has in the past played for Standard Liège, Maccabi Petah Tikva, Kayserispor, Larissa and the youth club Gadna Tel Aviv Yehuda.

See also
 Israelis
 List of notable Israelis
 List of Israeli Arab Muslims
 List of Arab citizens of Israel
 Arab Christians
 Arab citizens of Israel

References

Arab Christians
Arab Christians
 
Israeli Arab
Arab Christians